Gennaro "Jerry" Cuomo (born 1962) is an American software engineer who has worked for IBM since 1987. Holding the title of IBM Fellow, Cuomo is known as one of the founding fathers of IBM WebSphere Software, a software framework and middleware that hosts Java-based web applications.

Cuomo has filed for over 50 US patents and has been cited over 3000 times. His most visible patent is the first use of the "Someone is typing..." indicator found in instant messaging applications (U.S. Patent 5,990,887).

At IBM, Cuomo has led projects in the areas of: Blockchain, APIs, cloud computing, mobile computing, Internet of Things, web server performance & availability, web security, web caching, edge computing, service-oriented architecture and REST.

Cuomo is the co-author of the book, Blockchain for Business, that illustrates how blockchain technology is re-imagining many of the world's most fundamental business interactions and opening the door to new styles of digital interactions that have yet to be imagined. In March 2016 and 2018, Cuomo was called upon by the United States government as an expert witness to testify to US Energy and Commerce Committee on Digital Currency and Blockchain.   During his 2016 testimony Cuomo urged the Obama administration to adopt Blockchain as a primary means to protect citizen identity and to enhance national security.  His testimony can be seen on YouTube.

Cuomo is currently the VP & CTO of the new IBM Automation business unit, where he is driving the technical strategy for AI-powered automation and hosts the podcast the Art of Automation.

References 

American software engineers
1962 births
Living people